Regulator of nonsense transcripts 3A is a protein that in humans is encoded by the UPF3A gene.

This gene encodes a protein that is part of a post-splicing multiprotein complex involved in both mRNA nuclear export and mRNA surveillance. The encoded protein is one of two functional homologs to yeast Upf3p. mRNA surveillance detects exported mRNAs with truncated open reading frames and initiates nonsense-mediated mRNA decay (NMD). When translation ends upstream from the last exon-exon junction, this triggers NMD to degrade mRNAs containing premature stop codons. This protein binds to the mRNA and remains bound after nuclear export, acting as a nucleocytoplasmic shuttling protein. It forms with RBM8A a complex that binds specifically 20 nt upstream of exon-exon junctions. This gene is located on the long arm of chromosome 13. Two splice variants encoding different isoforms have been found for this gene.

Interactions
UPF3A has been shown to interact with RBM8A, UPF2 and UPF1.

References

Further reading